Mark Steele is a South African politician with the opposition Democratic Alliance. He is a member of the KwaZulu-Natal Legislature. Steele was elected to Parliament for the DA in 2009. His constituency in the Kwa-Zulu Natal Provincial Legislature is Ugu North, KwaZulu Natal. He transferred to KwaZulu-Natal in 2011 when he traded places with former caucus leader John Steenhuisen. Steele has also been a ward councillor.

References

Year of birth missing (living people)
Living people
Democratic Alliance (South Africa) politicians
Members of the National Assembly of South Africa